Cerithium renovatum is a species of sea snail, a marine gastropod mollusk in the family Cerithiidae.

Description

Distribution

References

External links
 Philippi, R. A. (1836). Enumeratio molluscorum Siciliae cum viventium tum in tellure tertiaria fossilium, quae in itinere suo observavit. Vol. 1. I-XIV, 1-303, Tab. XIII-XXVIII. Schropp, Berlin
 Monterosato T. A. (di) (1884). Nomenclatura generica e specifica di alcune conchiglie mediterranee. Palermo, Virzi, 152 pp
 Pallary P. (1938). Les Mollusques marins de la Syrie. Journal de Conchyliologie. 82(1): 5-58, pls 1-2
 Locard A. & Caziot E. (1900-1901). Les coquilles marines des côtes de Corse. Annales de la Société Linnéenne de Lyon, 46: 193-274 [1900; 47: 1-80, 159-291]

Cerithiidae
Gastropods described in 1884